Mocis kagoshimaensis is a species of moth of the family Erebidae. It is found in Japan (Kyushu).

References

Moths described in 2010
Mocis
Moths of Japan